The Karen State National Organisation (KSNA) was a political party in Myanmar.

History
Following the reintroduction of multi-party democracy after the 8888 Uprising, the party contested three seats in the 1990 general elections. It received 0.05% of the vote, winning one seat; U Saw Tun Pe in Hlaingbwe.

The party was banned by the military government on 27 November 1991.

References

Defunct political parties in Myanmar
1991 disestablishments in Myanmar
Political parties disestablished in 1991